Scleroplax granulata is a species of crab in the monotypic genus Scleroplax. It was first described by Mary J. Rathbun in a paper dated 1893 but only published in 1894.

Scleroplax lives as a commensal of various burrowing animals including the mud shrimp Neotrypaea californiensis, N. gigas, Upogebia pugettensis and U. macginiteorum, and the echiuran worm Urechis caupo (known as the "fat innkeeper"), and occurs from Vancouver Island, British Columbia to Punta Abreojos, Mulegé, Baja California Sur, Mexico.

References

Pinnotheroidea
Crustaceans of the eastern Pacific Ocean
Monotypic arthropod genera
Taxa named by Mary J. Rathbun